Eden Links (born 25 March 1989) is a South African cricketer. He made his first-class debut for Northerns in the 2009–10 CSA Provincial Three-Day Challenge on 19 November 2009.

References

External links
 

1989 births
Living people
South African cricketers
North West cricketers
Northerns cricketers
People from Overstrand Local Municipality